East Noble School Corporation is the largest of the four school corporations in Noble County, Indiana, covering the eastern third of the county. It includes the areas of Orange, Wayne, Allen and Swan Townships, and serves to educate the children located in the cities and towns of Rome City, Brimfield, Kendallville, Avilla and LaOtto.

History 
East Noble School Corporation has its origins from the school consolidations  that occurred in Indiana in the 1950s & 1960s, due to an act of the Indiana General Assembly, At that time, the high schools in Rome City, Avilla and Kendallville were made into junior high/middle schools. In 1966, construction of East Noble High School was completed. The first class entered East Noble (also known as EN) the fall of 1966. East Noble's first graduating class was in 1967 .

Realignment & the closing of LaOtto Elementary 
From 1965-2009, elementary aged students attended LaOtto Elementary School for grades K-5.  In 2009, East Noble School Corporation's School Board of trustees voted to close LaOtto Elementary.  This also resulted making Rome City, Avilla and Kendallville Elementary/Middle Schools for K-6 students, and created East Noble Middle School in Kendallville for grades 7 & 8.

References

External links 
Noble County Answer Book, Annual Publication of the Kendallville News-Sun
East Noble School Corporation website

School districts in Indiana
Education in Noble County, Indiana